The canton of Châlons-en-Champagne-3 is an administrative division of the Marne department, northeastern France. Its borders were modified at the French canton reorganisation which came into effect in March 2015. Its seat is in Châlons-en-Champagne.

It consists of the following communes:
 
Breuvery-sur-Coole
Bussy-Lettrée
Cernon
Châlons-en-Champagne (partly)
Cheniers
Cheppes-la-Prairie
Chepy
Coupetz
Coupéville
Dampierre-sur-Moivre
Dommartin-Lettrée
Écury-sur-Coole
L'Épine
Faux-Vésigneul
Francheville
Le Fresne
Haussimont
Lenharrée
Mairy-sur-Marne
Marson
Moivre
Moncetz-Longevas
Montépreux
Nuisement-sur-Coole
Omey
Pogny
Saint-Étienne-au-Temple
Saint-Germain-la-Ville
Saint-Jean-sur-Moivre
Saint-Martin-aux-Champs
Saint-Memmie
Saint-Quentin-sur-Coole
Sarry
Sogny-aux-Moulins
Sommesous
Soudé
Soudron
Togny-aux-Bœufs
Vassimont-et-Chapelaine
Vatry
Vésigneul-sur-Marne
Vitry-la-Ville

References

Cantons of Marne (department)